Saint Andrew South East is one of the 15 parliamentary constituencies of the Caribbean nation of Grenada.

Members

Election results

2022

References

Constituencies of Grenada